Grapholita discretana is a moth of the family Tortricidae. It was described by Maximilian Ferdinand Wocke in 1861. It is found in most of Europe, except Great Britain, Ireland, the Iberian Peninsula and most of the Balkan Peninsula.

The wingspan is 15–19 mm. Adults are recorded on the wing from May to June.

The larvae feed on Humulus lupulus. The species overwinters in the larval stage.

References

 "Grapholita discretana (Wocke, 1861)". ''Insecta.pro. Retrieved February 5, 2020.

Moths described in 1861
Grapholitini
Moths of Europe
Taxa named by Maximilian Ferdinand Wocke
Humulus